{{DISPLAYTITLE:Kappa1 Lupi}}

Kappa1 Lupi is a solitary star in the southern constellation of Lupus. It is visible to the naked eye with an apparent visual magnitude of 3.86, and forms a double star with Kappa2 Lupi. Based upon an annual parallax shift of 18.12 mas as seen from Earth, it is located about 180 light years from the Sun. Both Kappa1 Lupi and its neighbor Kappa2 Lupi are members of the Hyades Stream, which is a moving group that is coincident with the proper motions of the Hyades cluster.

This is a B-type main sequence star with a stellar classification of B9.5 Vne. The 'n' suffix indicates the spectrum shows "nebulous" absorption lines due to rapid rotation, while the 'e' means this is a Be star that displays Balmer series emission lines. With an estimated age of 195 million years, it is about 75% of the way through its life span on the main sequence. The star is rotating with a projected rotational velocity of 191 km/s. This rate of spin is giving the star an oblate shape with an equatorial bulge that is an estimated 9% larger than the polar radius.

In Chinese astronomy, Kappa1 Lupi is called 騎陣將軍, Pinyin: Qízhènjiāngjūn, meaning Chariots and Cavalry General, because this star is marking itself and stand alone in Chariots and Cavalry General asterism, Root mansion (see : Chinese constellation).

References

External links

B-type main-sequence stars
Be stars
Hyades Stream
Lupus (constellation)
Lupi, Kappa1
Durchmusterung objects
134481
074376
5646